Richard Newton Bennett  (27 October 1770 - 15 February 1836) was  Chief Justice of Tobago from 1832 until 1833.
 
Beamish was born in Blackstoops, County Wexford and educated at Trinity College Dublin. He was called to the bar in 1796. Bennett corresponded with Daniel O'Connell.

His nephew was the first officer to die in the service of Queen Victoria when he was shot by John Nichols Thom in Bossenden Wood in Kent.

References

1770 births
People from County Wexford
Alumni of Trinity College Dublin
Chief Justices of Tobago
1836 deaths
19th-century Irish judges